A lubber line, also known as a lubber's line, is a fixed line on a compass binnacle or radar plan position indicator display pointing towards the front of the ship or aircraft  and corresponding to the craft's centerline (being the customary direction of movement).

The line represents 0 degrees and is therefore the zero-point from which relative bearings are measured, e.g., "twenty degrees to port".

Compasses on sailboats may have additional lubber lines at forty-five degrees from the centerline. This represents about as close to the wind as the average boat will sail. These lubber lines may be used when sailing close hauled to see if you are on the closest course to your destination, without having to add or subtract the 45 degrees every few minutes, or recalculate your required heading every time you tack. The main line on the compass reads your current (close-hauled) heading and the leeward lubber line will read the bearing to your destination, regardless of whether you are on port or starboard tack. Lubber lines also help you to see windshifts when racing. If you are sailing close-hauled with good trim and you notice that your bearing to the windward mark starts to drift outside the lubber line (angle becoming greater than 45 degrees) you are being headed, and should consider tacking.

Directional Gyros on aircraft also have additional forty-five degree lubber lines. These are useful for intercepting tracks and making procedure turns.

Etymology

The name comes from "lubber", a nautical term for a novice sailor or landlubber. It has also been called a lubber's mark or lubber's point, though use of these terms declined in the 20th century.

References

Navigation
Navigational equipment
Radar